The People's Choice Awards India was an awards show held on October 27, 2012, in Mumbai, India, and which aired on Colors TV on November 25. An adaptation of the US version, the Indian edition is licensed and produced by Bulldog Media & Entertainment, sponsored by Procter & Gamble, and the winners were voted on by the general public.

Categories
The nomination categories are across four genres - Movies, TV, Music and Sports. The inclusion of a Sports Category with a Favourite Sportsperson award is unique to the Indian show.

Nominees
Winners are listed in bold.

Movies

Television

Music

Sports

Special Honours
 Priyanka Chopra was felicitated with Favourite International Music Debut Award for her 3× Platinum Certified debut single "In My City".
 Hema Malini was felicitated with the Ageless Beauty Honour.
 2012 Summer Olympics medalists Mary Kom, Gagan Narang, Yogeshwar Dutt and Sushil Kumar were felicitated by Katrina Kaif. The other sportspeople who were honoured were Vijay Kumar and Saina Nehwal.

Event

Highlights
 Priyanka Chopra paid her tribute to Yash Chopra, who died few days before the award show.
 Many celebrities cascaded down in designer finery at the red carpet event of India's first-ever People's Choice Awards held in Mumbai. The People's Choice Awards are rewarded through votes collected by the common people.
 Bollywood's who's who were seen at the People's Choice Awards 2012 Indian edition, but Saif Ali Khan was conspicuous by his absence.
 The People's Choice Awards were held in India for the first time on October 27, 2012, in Mumbai.
 Indian actress Madhuri Dixit performed a top-notch tableau exhibiting her charming dance moves in a furious mix of many of her movie-song hits.
 In attendance were Bollywood celebrities, including Salman Khan, Amitabh Bachchan, Priyanka Chopra, Kareena Kapoor, Katrina Kaif, Ranbir Kapoor, Madhuri Dixit, Darsheel Safary, Rakhi Sawant, Ayushmann Khurrana, Parineeti Chopra, Chitrangda Singh, Ekta Kapoor, Bhagyashree, Prabhu Deva, Hema Malini and Sameera Reddy.

See also

 List of Asian television awards
 People's Choice Awards

References

External links 
 
 

Indian television awards
India
2012 Indian film awards
2012 in Indian television